Denis David Douglin (born May 7, 1988) is an American professional boxer. As an amateur he was the 2008 National Golden Gloves middleweight champion.

Amateur career 
Douglin finished his amateur career with a 95-9 record. In addition to the 2008 National Golden Gloves Championship, he was 2007 National PAL champion, 2007 National Ringside champion, and a three-time state Golden Gloves champion (New York in 2006, and New Jersey in 2007 and 2008). Douglin was honored by the New Jersey Boxing Hall of Fame as its 2008 Amateur Boxer of the Year.

Professional career 
Douglin made his professional debut on February 13, 2009 defeating Roberto Irrizarry at the Roseland Ballroom in New York. He went undefeated in his first twelve bouts before falling to Doel Carrasquillo in February 2011. At 14-1 he fought Jermell Charlo (17-0, 8 knockouts at the time) on the Victor Ortiz-Josesito Lopez June 2012 undercard at the Staples Center in Los Angeles, and fought former WBC champion Anthony Dirrell (31-1-1) in 2017.

References

External links 
 

1988 births
Living people
Boxers from New Jersey
American male boxers
Middleweight boxers
Sportspeople from Brooklyn
Boxers from New York City
National Golden Gloves champions